English singer and songwriter Little Boots has released three studio albums, one live album, 10 extended plays, 10 mixtapes, 18 singles (including four as a featured artist), four promotional singles and 16 music videos.

Little Boots debuted in 2005 as the lead singer of the electronic band Dead Disco. The group disbanded in 2008 after releasing four singles in the United Kingdom.

Her solo debut album, Hands, was released in June 2009. It reached number five on the UK Albums Chart and was certified gold by the British Phonographic Industry (BPI). The album's second single, "Remedy", peaked at number six on the UK Singles Chart. In the United States, an extended play titled Illuminations was released in June 2009, reaching number 14 on the Billboard Dance/Electronic Albums chart.

Little Boots' second studio album, Nocturnes, was released in May 2013.

Albums

Studio albums

Live albums

Mixtapes

Extended plays

Singles

As lead artist

As featured artist

Promotional singles

Other charted songs

Guest appearances

Remixes

Music videos

References

External links
 
 
 
 

Discographies of British artists
Electronic music discographies
Pop music discographies

it:Little Boots#Discografia